In Navajo religious belief, a chindi is the ghost left behind after a person dies, believed to leave the body with the deceased's last breath.  It is everything that was bad about the person; the "residue that man has been unable to bring into universal harmony".  Traditional Navajo believe that contact with a chindi can cause illness ("ghost sickness") and death.  Chindi are believed to linger around the deceased's bones or possessions, so possessions are often destroyed after death and contact with bodies is avoided. After death, the deceased's name is never spoken, for fear that the chindi will hear and come and make one ill.  Traditional Navajo practice is to allow death to occur outdoors, to allow the chindi to disperse.  If a person dies in a house or hogan, that building is believed to be inhabited by the chindi and is abandoned.

See also 

 Enemy Way
 Vengeful ghost

Footnotes 

Ghosts
Navajo mythology
Legendary creatures of the indigenous peoples of North America